Ad Stoma was a fort in the Roman province of Moesia. As Tabula Peutingeriana shows it is situated between Histriopolis and Salsovia; 60 miles from Histriopolis and 24 miles from Salsovia.

See also
List of castra

External links
Roman castra from Romania - Google Maps / Earth

Notes

Roman legionary fortresses in Romania
History of Dobruja